Brian Ó Néill, Baron Dungannon (died 18 April 1562) was an Irish aristocrat of the Elizabethan era. He was part of the O'Neill dynasty, a Gaelic family in Ulster.

Life
Brian's father was Matthew O'Neill, 1st Baron Dungannon, who had been given his title by King Henry VIII as part of the surrender and regrant policy. Matthew was assassinated by his half-brother Shane O'Neill in 1558. Brian had been imprisoned in Scotland by James MacDonnell in early 1556, but appears to have returned to Ulster in late 1558 or early 1559.<ref name=Obyrne>[https://www.dib.ie/biography/oneill-o-neill-brian-a6947 O'Byrne, Emmett. "O'Neill (Ó Néill), Brian", Dictionary of Irish Biography]</ref>

Shane tried to have the government recognise Matthew and his sons as illegitimate, but they continued to be supported by the Viceroy, The 3rd Earl of Sussex, in Dublin. Brian pursued his claims to the Earldom of Tyrone and lobbied the government to eject Shane from Tír Eoghain.

In 1562, Shane and Brian were ordered to attend the Court in London to present their cases to Queen Elizabeth I and her ministers. Shane came to London, but while Brian was travelling from Newry to Carlingford, he was assassinated by Turlough Luineach O'Neill, almost certainly on the orders of Shane. While Shane made a melodramatic submission to the Queen in London, she only partly accepted his claims. Shane was himself assassinated five years later by the MacDonnells of Antrim.

Brian was succeeded by his younger brother Hugh who became Earl of Tyrone and head of the Ó Néills. His other brothers were Cormac and Arthur. In Gaelic form he is often known as Brian mac Baron Ó Néill.

References

Bibliography
 Falls, Cyril. Elizabeth's Irish Wars. Syracuse University Press, 1997. 
 Morgan, Hiram. Tyrone's Rebellion''. Boydell Press, 1999.

16th-century Irish people
People of Elizabethan Ireland
People from County Tyrone
Year of birth unknown
Barons in the Peerage of Ireland
1562 deaths
Assassinations in Ireland